Plenimir was a Bulgarian prince (knyaz), the son of emperor (tsar) Peter I (r. 927–969). He was one of three sons of Peter I, all born between 931 and 944. Historiography is well-informed on his two brothers, Boris II and Roman, while scarce information exist on Plenimir. His brothers reigned as Bulgarian tsars Boris II (r. 969–971) and Roman (r. 977–991).

References

Sources

Further reading

10th-century births
10th-century deaths
10th-century Bulgarian people
Bulgarian princes
Krum's dynasty
People from Veliki Preslav
Bulgarian people of Greek descent
Sons of emperors